Postfunctionalism is a theory of European integration put forward by Liesbet Hooghe and Gary Marks.

See also
Neofunctionalism
Intergovernmentalism

References

European Union
Political science theories